The 2011–12 Bermudian Premier Division is the 49th season of the highest competitive football league in Bermuda, which was founded in 1963. The competition will begin in October 2011 and end in March 2012. North Village Rams are the defending champions, having won their eighth league championship last season.

Teams
Somerset Eagles and Devonshire Colts were relegated to the Bermuda First Division after finishing last season in ninth and tenth place, respectively. They were replaced by the top two clubs from the First Division, champions Somerset Trojans and runners-up Robin Hood FC.

League table

Results

Top scorers

References

External links
 Bermuda Football Association

Bermudian Premier Division seasons
Bermuda
1